The Pennsylvania State Game Lands Number 39 are Pennsylvania State Game Lands in Venango County in Pennsylvania in the United States providing hunting, bird watching, and other activities.

Geography
State Game Lands Number 39 is located in Clinton, Frenchcreek, Irwin, Mineral, Sandycreek and Victory Townships in Venango County. Pennsylvania State Game Lands Number 130 is located to the west.

Statistics

References

039
Protected areas of Venango County, Pennsylvania